Gennadiy Laliyev (born March 30, 1979) is a Kazakhstani wrestler who competed in the Men's Freestyle 74 kg at the 2004 Summer Olympics representing Kazakhstan and won the silver medal.  He also competed in the 2008 Summer Olympics in the Men's Freestyle 84 kg, placing 13th. He has been a scholarship holder with the Olympic Solidarity program since November 2002.

References

1979 births
Living people
Wrestlers at the 2000 Summer Olympics
Wrestlers at the 2004 Summer Olympics
Wrestlers at the 2008 Summer Olympics
Olympic wrestlers of Kazakhstan
Olympic silver medalists for Kazakhstan
Olympic medalists in wrestling
Wrestlers at the 2002 Asian Games
Medalists at the 2004 Summer Olympics
Kazakhstani male sport wrestlers
Asian Games competitors for Kazakhstan
20th-century Kazakhstani people
21st-century Kazakhstani people